The Jataté River is a river of Chiapas, Mexico. The river runs through a canyon and is a jade-green color.

The Jataté is a tributary of the Lacantún River, which is part of the Usumacinta River system.

See also
List of rivers of Mexico

References

Atlas of Mexico, 1975 (https://web.archive.org/web/20120908140150/http://lib.utexas.edu/maps/atlas_mexico/river_basins.jpg).
The Prentice Hall American World Atlas, 1984.
Rand McNally, The New International Atlas, 1993.

Rivers of Chiapas
Usumacinta River